Khvajeh Dizaj (also Romanized as Khvājeh Dīzaj; also known as Khajeh Dizaj, Khodza-diza, and Khvājeh Dīzeh) is a village in Aji Chay Rural District, in the Central District of Tabriz County, East Azerbaijan Province, Iran. At the 2006 census, its population was 1,581, in 415 families.

References 

Populated places in Tabriz County